Jupiter's Legacy may refer to:

Jupiter's Legacy (comic) by Mark Millar, published by Image Comics in 2013
Jupiter's Legacy (TV series), a 2021 Netflix series based on the comic